James Edwin Haas was an American singer who performed vocals for many artists including Andy Williams, Neil Diamond, Jackson Browne, David Cassidy, Leif Garrett, Pink Floyd, and Barry Manilow. Leif Garrett, after Haas' death, explained that in multiple tracks in his earlier albums Haas actually replaced his vocals entirely. The producers had wanted him to "smooth" Garrett's uneven vocals, but made the choice sometimes to replace Garrett entirely on his own albums. In some cases, Garrett's producers even brought in Haas to sing for Garrett behind a curtain during some live concert tour performances. He was a member of Roger Waters' The Bleeding Heart Band.

A Facebook post from one of his associated acts announced James' death in January 2018, which was later confirmed in an interview with Garrett.

Discography

References

Year of birth missing (living people)
Possibly living people
American male singers
American session musicians